Martin Bartlett may refer to:

 Martin Bartlett (Home and Away), a character on the TV soap opera Home and Away
 Martin F. Bartlett, American politician from Maine
 Martin James Bartlett (born 1996), English classical pianist